Estonian Cup 2008–09 was the twenty-second season of the Estonian football knockout tournament. Winners of the cup qualified for the second qualifying round of the UEFA Europa League 2009–10. The defending champions were Flora Tallinn, who successfully defended their title this year.

First round

|colspan="3" style="background-color:#97DEFF"|July 22, 2008

|-
|colspan="3" style="background-color:#97DEFF"|July 23, 2008

|-
|colspan="3" style="background-color:#97DEFF"|July 30, 2008

|-
|colspan="3" style="background-color:#97DEFF"|August 6, 2008

|}

The following teams received a bye in this round:

Second round

|colspan="3" style="background-color:#97DEFF"|August 5, 2008

|-
|colspan="3" style="background-color:#97DEFF"|August 6, 2008

|-
|colspan="3" style="background-color:#97DEFF"|August 7, 2008

|-
|colspan="3" style="background-color:#97DEFF"|August 12, 2008

|-
|colspan="3" style="background-color:#97DEFF"|August 13, 2008

|-
|colspan="3" style="background-color:#97DEFF"|August 14, 2008

|-
|colspan="3" style="background-color:#97DEFF"|August 19, 2008

|-
|colspan="3" style="background-color:#97DEFF"|August 20, 2008

|-
|colspan="3" style="background-color:#97DEFF"|August 21, 2008

|-
|colspan="3" style="background-color:#97DEFF"|August 27, 2008

|}

Third round

|colspan="3" style="background-color:#97DEFF"|September 2, 2008

|-
|colspan="3" style="background-color:#97DEFF"|September 3, 2008

|-
|colspan="3" style="background-color:#97DEFF"|September 4, 2008

|-
|colspan="3" style="background-color:#97DEFF"|September 6, 2008

|-
|colspan="3" style="background-color:#97DEFF"|September 9, 2008

|-
|colspan="3" style="background-color:#97DEFF"|September 11, 2008

|-
|colspan="3" style="background-color:#97DEFF"|September 17, 2008

|}
1Vaprus were disqualified from the competition because of the use of an ineligible player in their game against Ganvix.

Fourth round

|colspan="3" style="background-color:#97DEFF"|September 23, 2008

|-
|colspan="3" style="background-color:#97DEFF"|September 24, 2008

|-
|colspan="3" style="background-color:#97DEFF"|October 1, 2008

|-
|colspan="3" style="background-color:#97DEFF"|October 8, 2008

|-
|colspan="3" style="background-color:#97DEFF"|October 11, 2008

|-
|colspan="3" style="background-color:#97DEFF"|October 26, 2008

|}

Quarter-finals

Semi-finals

Final

Top scorers

External links
 Official site

References
Estonia Cup 2008/09 Rec.Sport.Soccer Statistics Foundation

Estonian Cup seasons
Cup
Cup
Estonian